Dupuy de Lome may refer to:

 Enrique Dupuy de Lôme, Spanish Minister to the United States in 1892
 Henri Dupuy de Lôme, a French naval architect in the 19th century
 French armoured cruiser Dupuy de Lôme (1887), an armoured cruiser of the French navy which entered service in 1890, named after naval architect Henri Dupuy de Lôme
 French submarine Dupuy de Lôme (Q105)
 Dupuy de Lôme (A759), an intelligence ship of the French Navy which entered service in 2006, also named after Henri Dupuy de Lôme